The 2021–2022 FIE Fencing World Cup began in September 2021 and will end in July 2022 at the 2022 World Fencing Championships held in Cairo.

Individual épée

Men's épée

Women's épée

Individual foil

Men's foil

Women's foil

Individual sabre

Men's sabre

Women's sabre

Team épée

Men's team épée

Women's team épée

Team foil

Men's team foil

Women's team foil

Team sabre

Men's team sabre

Women's team sabre

References 

 
 

Fencing World Cup
2021 in fencing
2022 in fencing